B.C. Dutt class of tugboats are series of service watercraft built by Tebma Shipyard Limited (a subsidiary of Bharati Shipyard Ltd), for Indian navy during 1998-99. The vessels in the class have a rated capacity of 25 ton bollard pull. The propulsion is provided by Schottel Rudder Propeller (SRP). Bhim class tugboat is a follow-up order of B.C. Dutt class tugboat.

Vessels in the class

Specifications
Length: 28 m
Breadth: 9.40 m
Depth: 4 m
Speed: 12.5 knots
Bollard pull: 25 tonnes
Displacement: 355 tonnes
Draft: 1.6 m
Output: 2 X 933 kW
Main engines: Cummins KTA 3067 M

See also
Tugboats of the Indian Navy

References

 
Auxiliary ships of the Indian Navy
Tugs of the Indian Navy
Auxiliary tugboat classes